André Mikhelson was a Russian actor, in mostly British films. He was born in Moscow, in 1903.

Selected filmography

 The Gambler and the Lady (1952) - El Greco (uncredited)
 Desperate Moment (1953) - Polizei Inspector
 Star of My Night (1954) - Papa Condor
 The Divided Heart (1954) - Prof. Miran
 To Paris with Love (1955) - Head Porter (uncredited)
 Break in the Circle (1955) - Russian thug answering Ludwigstrasse door
 Little Red Monkey (1955) - East German Chief of Border Guards (uncredited)
 I Am a Camera (1955) - Head Waiter (Troika)
 The Intimate Stranger (1956) - Steve Vadney
 The Iron Petticoat (1956) - Charash
 Loser Takes All (1956) - Head Waiter (uncredited)
 Anastasia (1956) - Older Man (uncredited)
 Guilty ? (1956) - Santos
 Dangerous Exile (1957) - Prison Doctor Perrot (uncredited)
 The Diplomatic Corpse (1958) - Hamid
 The Inn of the Sixth Happiness (1958) - Russian Commissar (uncredited)
 A Touch of Larceny (1959) - 2nd Russian Officer (uncredited)
 Bobbikins (1959) - Russian Radio Announcer (uncredited) 
 Beyond the Curtain (1960) - Russian Colonel
 Dead Lucky (1960) - Croupier
 Edgar Wallace Mysteries, (The Man Who Was Nobody', episode), (1960) - (with Hazel Court) ' Croupier
 The Long Shadow (1961) - Feredi
 The Pursuers (1961) - Von Krosig
 The Middle Course (1961) - Commandant
 Edgar Wallace Mysteries, ('Flat Two' episode) (1962) - 1st. Croupier - (as Andre Mikhelson)
 Gaolbreak (1962) - Martinetti
 The Password is Courage (1962) - German Officer at Optician's (uncredited)
 Number Six (1962) - Head Waiter
 Call Me Bwana (1963) - Soviet Advisor (uncredited)
 Children of the Damned (1964) - Russian official
 Ring of Spies (1964) - Russian Embassy Official (uncredited)

Mikhelson also appeared in the Scotland Yard (film series), ('The Crossroad Gallows' episode, 1958); one episode of The Invisible Man (1958 TV series), ('Shadow on the Screen', (broadcast 25th. July, '59), with Greta Gynt, and Edward Judd; and the television series: Assignment Foreign Legion,  (1956), (with Merle Oberon, and Martin Benson (actor)); The Vise (1955 TV series), (1957); White Hunter (TV series), (1957-'59); Saturday Playhouse, (1958–61); Danger Man;  Zero One (TV series), (1962-'65), with Nigel Patrick; and three episodes of The Third Man (TV series), 1959-'65, with Michael Rennie, as Harry Lime.

References

External links

André Mikhelson at BFI

Date of birth unknown
Date of death unknown
British male film actors
British male television actors